The 1958 Jim Mideon 500 (known officially as 1958-31) was a NASCAR Grand National Series event that was held on Saturday, July 18, 1958, at Exhibition Stadium in Toronto, Ontario, Canada.

Children were entertained with a jigsaw puzzle of the Royal Family before the race began. Most of the cars in the race were either Chevrolet or Ford. All of the 19 drivers on the racing grid were born in the United States of America. Admission to the race was $2.00 for adults ($ when adjusted for inflation) and $0.50 for children ($ when adjusted for inflation).

The local bi-laws of the late 1950s allowed only team sports to be played professionally on Sunday. Since stock car racing wasn't included as one of the permitted "team sports," they had to operate the race on a Saturday night in compliance with city officials.

Race report
Prior to the race, invocation services were held along with the singing of The Star-Spangled Banner and God Save the Queen (Canada's official national anthem in 1958). The first green flag of the race was waved at 8:00 P.M. Eastern Daylight Saving Time (EDT) and the checkered flag was waved at approximately 8:46 P.M. EDT. One hundred laps were resolved in forty-six minutes on a paved oval track spanning ; making it a shorter track than Martinsville Speedway. The track itself was reported as being nearly a carbon copy of Bowman Gray Stadium in Winston-Salem, North Carolina.

Dick Walters received a last-place finish in this race due to an incident with his car's rear end.

This race is known for the debut of a young driver at 21 years, 16 days, Richard Petty, in car #142 (triple-digit numbers were legal in NASCAR until the 1970s). Even though NASCAR is usually associated with the Southern United States, Richard Petty's first Grand National Series race was officially on Canadian soil. He finished in 17th place; ten positions worse than he started. It was suggested that Lee Petty intentionally knocked his son out of the race due to racing issues. However, the truth of the matter was that Lee was trying to out-lap his son Richard (who was driving too slow) but used his "chrome horn" to take out the young Petty in his first race. More than 9,700 live spectators were on hand for this race even though heavy rainfall made the track somewhat slippery.

The race car drivers still had to commute to the races using the same stock cars that competed in a typical weekend's race through a policy of homologation (and under their own power). This policy was in effect until roughly 1975. By 1980, NASCAR had completely stopped tracking the year model of all the vehicles and most teams did not take stock cars to the track under their own power anymore.

Qualifying

Post-race consequences
The purse of the race was $4,200 in American dollars ($ when adjusted for inflation). To this day, this is the only event in the modern-day Monster Energy NASCAR Cup Series to take place in Canada as the track itself was later torn down to make way for newer development. Basically, the race track is now a soccer stadium and fairgrounds.

NASCAR would eventually return to a more prepared Canada in the 21st century. However, it would be to Montreal's Circuit Gilles Villeneuve for the Nationwide Series in addition to various small-town tracks for the "local" NASCAR Canadian Tire Series. Cayuga Speedway (now Jukasa Motor Speedway) wanted to host the first-ever Nationwide Series race in Canada but was turned down by NASCAR at a later date. Since then, the track has been on hiatus.

In 2010, Exhibition Place hosted its first NASCAR-sanctioned race, the Jumpstart 100, since this 1958 race, on a temporary street course spanning , for the Canadian Tire Series as part of Honda Indy Toronto weekend.

Finishing order

Timeline
Section reference: 
 Start of race: Rex White started the race with the pole position.
 Lap 18: The rear end of Dick Walters' vehicle was problematic, forcing him to exit the event early.
 Lap 72: Lee Petty takes over the lead from Rex White.
 Lap 90: Lennie Page withdrew from the event due to problems with his ignition.
 Lap 115: Richard Petty had a terminal crash; forcing him to withdraw from the race.
 Finish: Lee Petty was officially declared the winner of the race.

References

Jim Mideon 500
Jim Mideon 500
Jim Mideon 500
Former NASCAR races
Jim Mideon 500
NASCAR races at Exhibition Stadium
Sports competitions in Toronto